Breaza may refer to several places in Romania:

Breaza, a town in Prahova County
Breaza, Buzău, a commune in Buzău County 
Breaza, Mureș, a commune in Mureș County 
Breaza, Suceava, a commune in Suceava County, and its village of Breaza de Sus
 Breaza, a village in Negrilești Commune, Bistrița-Năsăud County
 Breaza, a village in Lisa Commune, Brașov County
 Breaza, a village in Bârgăuani Commune, Neamț County
 Breaza, a tributary of the Cibin in Sibiu County
 Breaza, a tributary of the Moldova
 Breaza (Olt), a tributary of the Olt in Brașov County

See also 
 Breazova (disambiguation)